Matteis is an ancient family surname of Italian origin.  Most Matteis families now reside in the southern part near Naples in a town called Avellino. The name originated in Chiusano San Domenico, and was often characterized with the nickname "Controme". Chiusano San Domenico is a very small town, but yet very old, going back more than 2000 years. It is mostly a residential community, with many families, including those bearing the name Matteis, including one "Pasquale Matteis". It's a very religious town, yet very nice and peaceful. Near the community is a great mountain which is very important to the people of Chiusano. It has religious significance, and has a cross at its top.

Source for Italian origin

The last name Matteis is an Italian surname that is quite common in some Italian regions like Campania in Southern Italy, Lazio in Central Italy, and Piemonte in Northern Italy while it is less common in Tuscany and Emilia-Romagna (Central Italy) and in Lombardia (Northern Italy).

The Matteis surname can be found in 48 Italian towns, whereas De Matteis which has the same origin is much more common and is present in 464 towns all over Italy, though it originates in Puglia (Southern Italy).

As for the origin of Matteis, it derives from the Latin name Mattheus (Matteo in Italian, Matthew in English)  used in the ablative plural Mattheis and then Matteis in Italian or De Matteis meaning literally “belonging to the family of Matteo” as both Matteis and De Matteis which end in the Latin ablative “–eis” mean that someone was son/daughter of a certain Matteo which was the ancestor of this family.

Reasoning for the name appearing in other parts of Europe
The name Matteis can be found in other parts of Europe, including Germany and England. This is probably due to migration out of Italy. Matteis families in Germany most likely are a result of the Matteis families in the Piemonte region of Italy moving North. Some Matteis families can be found in England and other parts of Europe. For example, the violinist Nicola Matteis traveled to London in the early 1670s. Still, most families can be found in Italy, where the name originated.

Matteis name appears in old Latin text

"Parentalia, inquam, unde Idololatriae malum caput extulit erroris. Nam gulae suae causa primum coeperunt homines prandia mortuis praeparare, quae ipsi comederent. etc. Quo spectant ista Tertulliani de Testim. Animae, Si quando extra portam cum obsoniis et matteis, tibi potius parentans ad busta recedis, aut a bustis dilutior redis. Idem vetatur in Capitul. Caroli M. l. 6. c. 194. etc."

Famous Matteis'
Matteis is the surname of the following people:

 Paolo de Matteis, Italian painter (1662–1728)
 Nicola Matteis (Matheis), violinist and composer (fl. c. 1670 – c. 1698)
 Giuseppe Matteis won the Gran Premio della Liberazione, an Italian road bicycle race held annually on 25 April since 1946, in 1971.
 Maria De Matteis (1898-1988), costume designer, won BAFTA Film Award in 1971 for Best Costume Design for her work in Waterloo (1970) and nominated for an Academy Award in 1957 for Best Costume Design, Color for her work in War and Peace (1956).

References